Keraudren is a surname. Notable people with this surname include:

Edith Ker, born Édith Denise Keraudren (1910–1997), French actress
Jean-Yves Keraudren, pseudonym of Théophile Jeusset (1910-1968), Breton nationalist
Monique Keraudren (1928-1981), French botanist
Pierre François Keraudren (1769-1858), French scientist and physician. Cape Keraudren and Keraudren Island in Western Australia are named after him.